In number theory, Proth's theorem is a primality test for Proth numbers.

It states that if p is a Proth number, of the form k2n + 1 with k odd and k < 2n, and if there exists an integer a for which

then p is prime. In this case p is called a Proth prime. This is a practical test because if p is prime, any chosen a has about a 50 percent chance of working, furthermore, since the calculation is mod p, only values of a smaller than p have to be taken into consideration.

In practice, however, a quadratic nonresidue of p is found via a modified Euclid's algorithm and taken as the value of a, since if a is a quadratic nonresidue modulo p then the converse is also true, and the test is conclusive. For such an a the Legendre symbol is

 

Thus, in contrast to many Monte Carlo primality tests (randomized algorithms that can return a false positive), the primality testing algorithm based on Proth's theorem is a Las Vegas algorithm, always returning the correct answer but with a running time that varies randomly. Note that if a is chosen to be a quadratic nonresidue as described above, the runtime is constant, safe for the time spent on finding such a quadratic nonresidue. Finding such a value is very fast compared to the actual test.

Numerical examples
Examples of the theorem include:

 for p = 3 = 1(21) + 1, we have that 2(3-1)/2 + 1 = 3 is divisible by 3, so 3 is prime.
 for p = 5 = 1(22) + 1, we have that 3(5-1)/2 + 1 = 10 is divisible by 5, so 5 is prime.
 for p = 13 = 3(22) + 1, we have that 5(13-1)/2 + 1 = 15626  is divisible by 13, so 13 is prime.
 for p = 9, which is not prime, there is no a such that a(9-1)/2 + 1 is divisible by 9.

The first Proth primes are :
3, 5, 13, 17, 41, 97, 113, 193, 241, 257, 353, 449, 577, 641, 673, 769, 929, 1153 ….

It was found by Peter Szabolcs in the PrimeGrid volunteer computing project which announced it on 6 November 2016. It is also the largest known non-Mersenne prime and largest Colbert number.

Proof

The proof for this theorem uses the Pocklington-Lehmer primality test, and closely resembles the proof of Pépin's test. The proof can be found on page 52 of the book by Ribenboim in the references.

History

François Proth (1852–1879) published the theorem in 1878.

See also
Pépin's test (the special case k = 1, where one chooses a = 3)
Sierpinski number

References

External links

Primality tests
Theorems about prime numbers

de:Prothsche Primzahl
nl:Prothgetal